Laser gyroscope may refer to:
 Ring laser gyroscope
 Fibre-optic gyroscope